Mikhail Alekseyevich Aleksandrov (born 26 August 1963) is a Russian professional football coach and a former player.

Playing career
As a player, he made his debut in the Soviet Second League in 1981 for FC Tekstilshchik Ivanovo.

References

1963 births
Sportspeople from Ivanovo
Living people
Soviet footballers
Russian footballers
Association football midfielders
Russian expatriate footballers
Expatriate footballers in Poland
Expatriate footballers in Finland
FC Tekstilshchik Ivanovo players
FC Fakel Voronezh players
FC Taganrog players
Russian football managers